Bérégadougou is a department or commune of Comoé Province in southern Burkina Faso. Its capital lies at the town of Bérégadougou. According to the 1996 census the department has a total population of 11,846.

Towns and villages
 Bérégadougou	(9,036 inhabitants) (capital)      **Malon Canton
 Fabedougou	(920 inhabitants)                          **Malon Canton
 Malon	(194 inhabitants)                                  **Malon Canton
 Serefedougou	(765 inhabitants)                          **Serefedougou Canton
 Taka Ledougou-Koko	(931 inhabitants)                  **Serefedougou Canton

References

Departments of Burkina Faso
Comoé Province